The A-League Men Coach of the Year is an annual soccer award presented to coaches in Australia. It recognises the most outstanding manager in the A-League Men each season. The recipient is chosen by a vote of all coaches at the conclusion of the regular season. The award was established in the first A-League season, 2005–06.

In 2006, the inaugural Coach of the Year award was given to Lawrie McKinna, who took Central Coast Mariners to the 2006 A-League Grand Final. The current holder of the award is Tony Popovic.

Three coaches have won the award multiple times, Graham Arnold in 2012, 2017, and 2018, Ernie Merrick in 2007 and 2010, and Tony Popovic in 2013, 2019, and 2022.

Winners

Awards won by nationality

Awards won by club

References

External links
 A-League website

Coach
Australian soccer trophies and awards
2006 establishments in Australia
Awards established in 2006
Australia